The year 1925 in television involved some significant events.
Below is a list of television-related events during 1925.



Global television events

Births

References

1925 in television